Kwan Wai Pang (born 20 March 1945 in Guilin, Guangxi), known professionally as Teddy Robin, is a Hong Kong English pop singer-songwriter, actor, and director and producer. He began his music career in mid 1960s when Hong Kong English pop was at its peak.  He formed a rock and roll band with his friends called Teddy Robin and the Playboys while Teddy was the vocal and guitarist.  The band was the first Chinese-led rock band in Hong Kong.  The band became a massive hit in Hong Kong.

From the 70s, Teddy started to get involved in the movie industry.  in 1979, he was the producer of his first movie 《Cops and Robbers 點指兵兵》. He then played a pivotal role at the Pearl City Production Company and Cinema City Company Limited.  Despite his heavy involvement in movie productions, he was still passionate about music and continued his involvement in record productions and film song creation during the time.

He has produced over 20 movies and directed 5 and 1/3 films throughout his career.  He won various awards across film and music festivals, such as the CASH Hall of Fame Award from the Composers and Authors Society of Hong Kong, The Best Original Film Song and the Best Supporting Actor from the Hong Kong Film Award, The Best Actor from Hong Kong Film Critics Society and The Best Actor from International Chinese Film Festival.  He is also one of the five founders of Hong Kong Film Directors' Guild and the Honorary Director of Hong Kong Performing Artistes Guild.

Early life
Teddy Robin was born in Guilin, Guangxi, alongside five brothers and sisters. He came to Hong Kong with his father in 1949, settling in Wan Chai.

As a rebellious child, Teddy was average at school. He always hung out at street court with his gangs. He called himself "Teddy Robin" because he admired the heroic image of Robin Hood.

At the early age of 11, Teddy started his career as a child broadcaster at Rediffusion (ATV).

Teddy developed his enthusiasm for rock and roll music when he first heard the sound of an electric guitar. Then he started to explore and learn to play electric guitar .  He then formed a rock band called "Teddy Robin and the Playboys" with his friends and his two younger brothers.

Apart from music, Teddy Robin is also a skilled painter and sketcher.  He designed the cover for his singles, including " I can’t be hurt any more", "Not All Lies", "Breakthrough", "365 Days", "Memories".

Music career
After graduating from high school, Teddy Robin worked as a Trainee Producer at Rediffusion English TV Station . He formed rock band "Teddy Robin and the Playboys" with Norman Chang, Fedrick Chan and his two younger brothers in 1966.

In the 1960s, the band was signed by Diamond Records and released its first album. In 1966, "Teddy Robin and the Playboys" was the home band of Rediffusion TV's most popular music program "Soundbite 66".

In 1968, Mr Chung King-fai invited Teddy to move from Rediffusion TV to TVB under the terms set by Teddy – to not only perform on the stage but also work behind the scene.   He acted in his first movie "The Cost of Love" for Shaw Brothers Studio in 1969.  Teddy Robin returned to Rediffusion TV in 1973 to host a youth show called "Melody Chain".

While in 1974, Teddy Robin realized rock and roll music started to diminish in Hong Kong, so he wandered to the United States and Canada until 1978.

Award and recognition
 2011 – Gallants – The Best Supporting Actor, the Hong Kong Film Award
 2011 – Gallants – The Best Original Film Song, the Hong Kong Film Award
 2011 – Gallants – The Best Actor, Hong Kong Film Critics Society
2011 – CASH Hall of Fame Award, Composers and Authors Society of Hong Kong
2012 – Merry Go Round – The Best Actor, International Chinese Film Festival
2017 – Lifetime Achievement Award, Asian Popup Cinema Festival

Personal life
Teddy Robin is married and has one son and one daughter.  His son works at Morgan Stanley in London as an Executive Director and his daughter is a sugar artist in Canada.

Filmography

As actor

As film director

As composer

See also
 Hong Kong English pop

Notes

References

External links
 

Chinese film directors
Living people
Hong Kong male film actors
Hong Kong film directors
Hong Kong male singers
People from Guilin
English-language singers from Hong Kong
Hong Kong Mandopop singers
Hong Kong male composers
Hong Kong composers
Male actors from Guangxi
Film directors from Guangxi
Chinese male singers
Singers from Guangxi
21st-century Hong Kong male actors
20th-century Hong Kong male actors
Hong Kong film score composers
1945 births
Male film score composers